Jean-Michel Bombardier (born August 22, 1970) is a Canadian former pair skater. With Michelle Menzies, he won two national titles and finished in the top ten at three World Championships.

Personal life 
Bombardier was born in Montreal, Quebec. He married fellow Canadian figure skater Josée Chouinard, and the couple had two children, twins Noah and Fiona, before separating in 2006.

Career 
Early in his career, Bombardier competed with Marie-Josée Fortin. With Stacey Ball, he won gold at the 1990 Nebelhorn Trophy, gold at the 1991 Skate America, and bronze at the 1991 Canadian Championships. They finished 8th at the 1991 World Championships.

In 1992, he teamed up with Michelle Menzies. The pair won two national titles, in 1995 and 1996. They won silver at the 1992 Skate Canada International and bronze the following year. They finished in the top ten at three World Championships.

Results

With Fortin

With Ball

With Menzies

References

1970 births
Canadian male pair skaters
French Quebecers
Living people
Figure skaters from Montreal